Vijay Singh Yadav (1953 – 16 May 2021) was an Indian politician. He was a member of the Rajya Sabha, the upper house of the Parliament of India, representing Bihar as a member of the Rashtriya Janata Dal. He was earlier a member of the Bihar Legislative Assembly from Danapur as a member of the Bharatiya Janata Party.

He died on 16 May 2021 at the age of 68.

References

1953 births
Date of birth missing
2021 deaths
Rajya Sabha members from Bihar
Bharatiya Janata Party politicians from Bihar
People from Patna
Members of the Bihar Legislative Assembly
Deaths from the COVID-19 pandemic in India